Yu Pinqing (1886 – December 24, 1945) was a politician and industrialist in the Republic of China. He was Supreme Member of the Southern Chahar Autonomous Government, later he was also appointed Vice-Chairman of the Mongolian United Autonomous Government and the Mongolian Autonomous Federation. He was born in Nangong, Zhili (Hebei).

Biography 
Yu Pinqing was an industrialist in Zhangjiakou. In 1924 he became an executive member of the chamber of commerce in Zhangjiakou.

In August 1937 Japanese Army occupied Zhangjiakou. Yu Pinqing was invited by Japanese, and he was appointed a member of the Peace Preservation Council in Chahar. In next month, Southern Chahar Autonomous Government was established, he was appointed Supreme Member of it. In November, the Mongolian United League Autonomous Government, the Southern Chahar Autonomous Government and the Northern Shanxi Autonomous Government held a representative assembly at Zhangjiakou. Then the Mengjiang United Committee was established, Yu was appointed a member of it.

In September 1939 three autonomous governments merged into the Mongolian United Autonomous Government, Yu Pinqing was appointed Vice-Chairman of it. In 1941 Mongolian United Autonomous Government was renamed and reformed to the Mongolian Autonomous Federation, while he also stayed on Vice-Chairman of it.

In August 1945 Mongolian Autonomous Federation had collapsed, then the Eighth Route Army occupied Zhangjiakou, and Yu Pinqing was arrested by it. In December 23 this year because of the charge of treason and surrender to enemy (namely Hanjian), he was sentenced to death on special tribunal, and executed by firing squad in the next day.

Footnotes

References 
 
 
 
 After the Victory, the Eight Route Army Executed Hanjian (1) (with picutures) 《 (1)》  CHN Great Power Net December 4, 2009.
 

1886 births
1945 deaths
Politicians from Xingtai
Republic of China politicians from Hebei
Businesspeople from Hebei
Executed Chinese collaborators with Imperial Japan
People executed by the Republic of China by firing squad
Mengjiang